Aliabad Jadid (also Romanized as ‘Alīābād Jadīd; also known as ‘Alīābād and ‘Alīābād-e Kankabūd) is a village in Nurali Rural District, in the Central District of Delfan County, Lorestan Province, Iran. At the 2006 census, its population was 20, in 5 families.

References 

Towns and villages in Delfan County